

The construction of the "Maulwurf I" was carried out under adverse conditions and lack of resources. It was only completed once Major General Ing Pedretti generously provided some rooms for final assembly in the artillery laboratory.

The first preliminary test flights were completed on 18 February 1923 at the military firing range Feliferhof. Under the expert guidance of Major Erich Kahler, the former commander of the airfield Thalerhof, the apparatus was prepared for first flight.

Specifications

References

Hang gliders